The S-8 is a rocket weapon developed by the Soviet Air Force for use by military aircraft. It remains in service with the Russian Air Force and various export customers.

Developed in the 1970s, the S-8 is an 80 mm (3.1 in) rocket used by fighter bombers and helicopters. The system entered service in 1984 and is produced in a variety of subtypes with different warheads, including HEAT anti-armor, high-explosive fragmentation, smoke, and incendiary, as well as the specialized S-8BM runway-destroying munition and the S-8DM fuel-air explosive variants. Each rocket is between 1.5 meters (4 ft 11 in) and 1.7 meters (5 ft 7 in) long and weighs between 11.3 kg (25 lb) and 15.2 kg (33.5 lb), depending on warhead and fuse. Range is 2 to 4 kilometers (1.3 to 2.6 mi).

The S-8 is generally carried in the B series of rocket pods, carrying either seven or 20 rockets.

In 2018, the Russian Aerospace Forces took delivery and completed state tests of several batches of the S-8OFP Broneboishchik, successor to the S-8. While both rockets are unguided, the S-8OFP has greater range, a heavier warhead, and a digital fuse. The rocket is intended for armament of Su-25 type aircraft and Mi-8 helicopters, depending on the settings of the fuse, is able to penetrate obstacles facing the set targets, it can also explode in front of the obstacle and behind the obstacle.

An armored self-propelled 80-tube MLRS vehicle using S-8 rockets has been developed by Belarusian industry. Relatively short range of the rocket (3 – 5 km cross-ground) compared to Grad rockets is compensated for by lower cost and greater beaten area from a high number of rockets. Serbia has developed the helicopter pod L80-07. The S-8 has been used in ground-to-ground mode against Ukrainian positions at Pavlopil by pro-Russian forces during the war in Donbas.

Rocket specifications

S-8OFP was already deployed in mid-late 2018 and have been seen at operational launch with Mi-35M helicopter.

See also
 S-5 rocket
 S-13 rocket
 Ugroza, a proposed upgrade of "dumb" rockets to salvo-fired laser-guided precision missiles

References

 Soviet/Russian Aircraft Weapons Since World War Two, Yefim Gordon, 
 Mil Mi-24 Hind Attack Helicopter, Yefim Gordon and Dimitri Komissarov, 
 Jane's Air Launched Weapons Issue 36, Duncan Lennox, 
 Warfare.ru S-8 rockets
 VTTV-99 S-8 rocket specs
 Army-2018: Zaslon Center presents new 80mm MLRS based on 4x4 UAZ pickup

Air-to-ground rockets of the Soviet Union
Military equipment introduced in the 1970s